The Church of Our Saviour, also known as the Church of Our Saviour at Mission Farm, the Mission of the Church of Our Saviour, and the Josiah Wood Jr. Farm, is a historic Episcopal church and farm complex located at 316 Mission Farm Road, in Killington, Vermont. The church is a Gothic Revival stone building, built in 1894-95 of Vermont granite. In addition to the church, the  Mission Farm property includes a c. 1817 farmhouse, a guest and retreat house, a vicarage, a bakery and agricultural buildings. On October 29, 1992, it was added to the National Register of Historic Places.  The Church of Our Saviour is part of the Three Rivers Regional Ministry of the Episcopal Diocese of Vermont, and the Rev. Lee Allison Crawford is the vicar.

Description and history
The Church of Our Saviour and Mission Farm are located on the east side of the Ottauquechee River, roughly across the river from the Killington Ski Resort to the west.  The developed portion of the property is roughly bisected by Mission Farm Road (an old alignment of United States Route 4), with the historic farm complex on the west side and the church on the east side.  The main farmhouse is a -story wood-frame structure, with a gabled roof and clapboard siding, with an attached converted carriage barn.  The church, standing directly across the street, is a stone structure, with its tall main block oriented perpendicular to the street, a shorter cross-gabled side ell, and a square tower in the crook of the joint between those sections.  Further south on the property stands a smaller wood-frame building that now serves as a bakery.

The farmhouse was built about 1817 by Josiah Wood, Jr.,  whose father was one of Killington's early settlers.  The house is one of the best-preserved examples of period residential architecture in eastern Rutland County.  Wood raised a large family here, operated a tavern, and was responsible for construction of the road.  The property remained in the hands of various Wood family members, until it was repurchased in 1894 by Wood's daughter, Elizabeth Wood Clement, who then donated it to the Episcopal Diocese of Vermont for use as a mission site.  The church, built in 1894–95, was designed by Rutland-based English architect Arthur H. Smith, then one of central Vermont's leading architects.  The church maintains an active mission, and the farm's fields continue to see some agricultural uses.

See also

National Register of Historic Places listings in Rutland County, Vermont

References

External links

Diocese of Vermont listing for Church of Our Saviour

Churches on the National Register of Historic Places in Vermont
Gothic Revival church buildings in Vermont
Episcopal churches in Vermont
Buildings and structures in Killington, Vermont
Churches completed in 1895
19th-century Episcopal church buildings
Churches in Rutland County, Vermont
Historic districts on the National Register of Historic Places in Vermont
Farms in Vermont
National Register of Historic Places in Rutland County, Vermont